Lega Basket Serie A statistical leaders are the season by season stats leaders of the top-tier level professional basketball league in Italy, the LBA (first division), and the all-time stats leaders of both the LBA and the Serie A2 (2nd division).

Top scorers by season
In basketball, points are the sum of the score accumulated through free throws or field goals. The LBA's scoring title is awarded to the player with the highest points per game average in a given regular season. Prior to the 1987–88 season, the league's Top Scorer was the player that scored the most total points in the league during the season. Since the 1987–88 season, the league's Top Scorer is the player with the highest scoring average per game during the season.

By total points scored

Starting with the 1974–75 season, stats accumulated in the league's playoffs were also counted. Through the 1987–88 season, the Top Scorer of the league was the player that scored the most total points. Starting with the 1989–90 season, the Top Scorer of the league was the player with the highest points per game scoring average.

By scoring average

Source: LegaBasket.it STATISTICHE .

All-time scoring leaders (1970–present)

The all-time top scoring leaders of games played in the LBA, the Italian top-tier level professional club basketball league, and the Serie A2, which is Italy's second tier competition. Includes points scored since the 1970–71 season, when Lega Basket took over the competitions.

References

Sources
Almanacco illustrato del basket 1990. Panini, Modena, 1989. 
Almanacco illustrato del basket 2009. Panini, Modena, 2008, p. 211.

External links 
 LBA official website 
 Italian League at Eurobasket.com

Lega Basket Serie A

it:Realizzatori del campionato italiano maschile di pallacanestro